General Carleton may refer to:

Guy Carleton (United States Army officer) (1857–1946), U.S. Army major general
Guy Carleton, 1st Baron Dorchester (1724–1808), British Army general
Henry Alexander Carleton (1814–1900), British Army general
James Henry Carleton (1814–1873), Union Army brigadier general and brevet major general

See also
Mark Carleton-Smith (born 1964), British Army general